Lada Akimova (born 29 October 1998) is a Russian model, singer and beauty pageant titleholder who was crowned Miss Earth Fire in 2017 and Miss Supertalent 2019 on May 10, 2019, in Seoul, South Korea. She is the first Miss Supertalent winner from Russia.

Pageantry

Miss Earth 2017
On November 4, 2017. Akimova ended up as Miss Earth - Fire 2017 which unofficially equivalent to third runner-up.

Miss Supertalent 2019
In May 2019, she traveled to Seoul, South Korea, to represent her country as "Miss Russia" at the Miss Supertalent 2019 and won the title of Miss Supertalent 2019

References

External links 

1998 births
Russian beauty pageant winners
Russian female models
Russian women singers
Living people
Miss Earth 2017 contestants